Alice Domurat Dreger is an American historian, bioethicist, author, and former professor of clinical medical humanities and bioethics at the Feinberg School of Medicine, Northwestern University, in Chicago, Illinois.

Dreger engages in academic work and activism in support of individuals born with atypical sex characteristics (intersex or disorders of sex development) and individuals born as conjoined twins. She challenges the perception that those with physical differences are somehow "broken" and need to be "fixed". She has opposed the use of "corrective" surgery on babies whose genitalia are considered "ambiguous". She has criticized the failure to follow such patients in later life and reported longer-term medical and psychological difficulties experienced by some of the people whose sex is arbitrarily assigned.

She supported J. Michael Bailey in the face of controversy over his book The Man Who Would Be Queen. Dreger has been criticized by transgender activist Lynn Conway for her support of psychologist Ray Blanchard's taxonomy of trans women. In a 2008 article and in her 2015 book, Galileo's Middle Finger, Dreger argued that the controversy had gone far beyond addressing the scientific theories presented in Bailey's book to become an attack upon the author.

Dreger has been a featured speaker at TED talks. She has also worked as a journalist, founding East Lansing Info, a website that covers local affairs in East Lansing, Michigan.

Education
Dreger received her Ph.D. in history and philosophy of science from Indiana University Bloomington in 1995.

Early career

Dreger has taught at both Michigan State University, where she received a Teacher-Scholar Award in 2000, and at Northwestern University (2005–2015).

During her doctoral work, she became interested in "how and why it is that scientists and medical doctors work to mediate the relationships between our bodies and our selves" and "why it is we often look to scientists and medical doctors to read or even alter our bodies". In 1995, she published a paper in Victorian Studies, examining 19th-century British medical attitudes toward intersex people. In 1998, she published the book Hermaphrodites and the Medical Invention of Sex and in 1999, Intersex in the age of ethics. Increasingly, she became engaged in intersex activism as well as scholarship, advocating that doctors accept a wide variety of genital structure rather than "correcting" babies' genitalia to conform to artificially gendered standards.  More recently, she has criticized the prenatal use of dexamethasone to normalize female genitalia in cases of congenital adrenal hyperplasia and tried to charge that its safety has not been sufficiently tested by pediatrician Maria New. However, the FDA found nothing worth pursuing on the topic.

In 2004, Dreger published One of Us: Conjoined Twins and the Future of Normal, an examination of conjoined twinning and of surgical practice. Described as "a book filled with warmth, humour and unexpected insights", it raised similar issues to her earlier work on intersex people: questioning the ways in which the surgical profession defines "acceptable limits of the normal" and enforces conformity to such norms. She criticized the lack of long-range follow-up studies of separated children. She also introduced more than twenty sets of conjoined twins, most of whom have adapted happily to the challenges of their situations. One reviewer stated that Dreger's intent is "to show us the humanity of people whose anatomies differ from ours".

In The Man Who Would Be Queen (2003), J. Michael Bailey promoted a hotly disputed theory of transsexualism by Ray Blanchard that characterized male-to-female transsexuals into two groups in a way that was seen by many as deeply offensive. In 2008, Dreger published an article in Archives of Sexual Behavior, describing in detail the opposition to Bailey and his work. A major concern for her was the ways in which attacks targeted him as a person and a scholar, rather than addressing his ideas. Dreger asserted that a theory, even if found threatening or offensive, should be judged by its supporting evidence. She also argued against reduction of the controversy to a simple dualism, seeing the ideas and actions of all those involved as "significantly more complicated". As result of the paper, Dreger herself was perceived as attacking trans people and drawn into an ongoing controversy.

In 2009, Dreger received a Guggenheim fellowship to study conflicts between activists and scientists. She has examined a number of conflicts, including the controversial career of Napoleon Chagnon. Dreger accepts that scientists, being human, have biases and ideologies. But, she argues, they must "put the truth first and the quest for social justice second" and try to "adhere to an intellectual agenda that [isn't] first and only political".

Galileo's Middle Finger
In 2015, Dreger published Galileo's Middle Finger, a book that covered her observations and experiences with controversies in academic medicine, especially those surrounding human sexuality. This included her work with intersex people, the career of Napoleon Chagnon, Dreger's criticisms of Maria New, and her defense of J. Michael Bailey and its consequences.
The New York Times described Dreger's "smart, delightful book" as "many things: a rant, a manifesto, a treasury of evocative new terms (sissyphobia, autogynephilia, phall-o-meter) and an account of the author's transformation" from activist to anti-activist and back again. The book also received positive reviews from the Chicago Tribune, Chronicle of Higher Education, Salon, and activist and author Dan Savage.

However, Galileo's Middle Finger also reignited controversy over her defense of Bailey and her discussion of transgender issues. The book was removed from consideration for a Lambda Literary Award after complaints. One critic accused Dreger of transphobia, saying that her book promoted the idea that trans women are "just self-hating homosexual men who believe they could have guilt-free sex if they were female and heterosexual men with an out-of-control fetish (autogynephilia)". Dreger protested the removal in an open letter to the Lambda Literary Foundation. Dreger herself has since reiterated her articulation of ideas in Galileo's Middle Finger that relate to trans women, stating that she considers both gender and sexuality to be relevant and valid concerns for people and therefore finds value in Blanchard's dual categorization, if not his terminology.

Later career
Dreger resigned from Northwestern University in August 2015, citing censorship issues. The school had ordered her and other editors of Atrium, a bioethics journal, to take down an article about consensual oral sex between a nurse and a patient. Although the article was eventually reposted, the university established its own editorial committee to approve future issues of the journal.

Dreger is the founder of East Lansing Info, a nonprofit local journalism web outlet covering the city of East Lansing, Michigan. She currently works as publisher, president, and reporter for the organization.

Fiction writing
In June 2022, Dreger published her first novel, The Index Case, under the pseudonym Molly Macallen. She discussed its origins and planned sequels with Iona Italia on Areo Magazines Two for Tea podcast.

Selected bibliography

Books

Journal articles

References

External links
 
 Interview with Alice Dreger
 "What Makes People Gay?", Alice Dreger, Big Think (YouTube video)

Living people
Bioethicists
Northwestern University faculty
Indiana University Bloomington alumni
Intersex rights activists
American medical historians
Year of birth missing (living people)
Place of birth missing (living people)
Intersex and medicine
Intersex rights in the United States
American women historians
21st-century American women